Richard Brinsley Sheridan (bapt. 26 May 1806 – 2 May 1888) was an English Whig politician.

Early life
He was born in London, the eldest son of Thomas Sheridan, colonial treasurer in the Cape of Good Hope, and the novelist Caroline Henrietta Callander of Craig forth and the grandson of his namesake, the playwright Richard Brinsley Sheridan. His maternal grandfather was Sir James Campbell. After his father died in 1817, his mother moved to London with her seven children.

Career
He served as High Sheriff of Dorset in 1838. He was Member of Parliament (MP) for Shaftesbury from 1845 to 1852 and for Dorchester from 1852 until he retired in 1868 and also Deputy Lieutenant for Dorset. He was a Liberal in favour of extending the right to vote.

Personal life
He eloped with and subsequently married Marcia Maria Grant, the daughter of Gen. Sir John Colquhoun Grant on 18May 1835. Together, they were the parents of three daughters and six sons:

 Edith Marcia Caroline Sheridan (1836–1876), who married Francis John Thynne, son of Lord John Thynne.
 Richard Brinsley Sheridan (1838–1868), who died unmarried.
 Francis John Rogers Sheridan (1842–1877), who died unmarried.
 Helena Charlotte Sheridan (1845–1893), who died unmarried.
 Algernon Thomas Brinsley Sheridan (1845–1931), who married Mary Lothrop Motley, daughter of John Lothrop Motley.
 Charles William Frederick Sheridan (1847–1896), who died unmarried.
 Thomas Constantine Henry Kier Sheridan (1851–1931), who died unmarried.
 James Colquhoun Grant Sheridan (1857–1865), who died young.
 Florence Sarah Wilhelmine Sheridan (d. 1909), who married Augustus Bampfylde, 2nd Baron Poltimore. 

Sheridan died on 2 May 1888.

References

External links 
 

1806 births
1888 deaths
Deputy Lieutenants of Dorset
Whig (British political party) MPs for English constituencies
Liberal Party (UK) MPs for English constituencies
UK MPs 1841–1847
UK MPs 1847–1852
UK MPs 1852–1857
UK MPs 1857–1859
UK MPs 1859–1865
UK MPs 1865–1868
High Sheriffs of Dorset